The Third cabinet of Nicolas Jean-de-Dieu Soult was announced on October 29, 1840 by King Louis Philippe I.
It replaced the Second cabinet of Adolphe Thiers.  

The ministry was replaced on September 19, 1847 by the Cabinet of François-Pierre Guizot.

Ministers

The cabinet was created by ordinance of October 29, 1840. The ministers were:

Undersecretaries of state were:
 Interior: Antoine François Passy (from 4 November 1840)
 Navy and Colonies: Jean Jubelin (from 9 August 1844)
 War: François Martineau des Chenez (from 10 November 1845)

References

Sources

French governments
1840 establishments in France
1847 disestablishments in France
Cabinets established in 1840
Cabinets disestablished in 1847